Captain Maurice Arthur Benjamin MC was a London born South African flying ace active during World War I. He was credited with eight aerial victories while serving as an observer/gunner in two-seater fighters.

Early life
Maurice Arthur Benjamin was born in London on 10 July 1883. When World War I began, he was working as a theatrical manager in South Africa.

World War I
Benjamin joined the Royal Flying Corps to serve in World War I. He began service as an aerial observer with 48 Squadron on 9 March 1917. He scored his first aerial victories on 6 and 9 April 1917 before being officially appointed as an observer on 11 April 1917. He would be credited with six more victories. As a result, he was awarded the Military Cross, gazetted 18 July 1917:
For conspicuous gallantry and devotion to duty. He helped to attack two large hostile machines, one of which was seen to crash to the ground. Previously he helped to engage three hostile scouts, one of which was destroyed and the remainder dispersed. He has helped to destroy four hostile machines in all.

He subsequently trained as a pilot, receiving Royal Aero Club certificate number 5883 on 3 February 1918. On 1 August 1918, he was promoted to temporary captain while on instructional duty with Home Establishment.

List of aerial victories
See also Aerial victory standards of World War I

Post World War I
On 1 August 1919, Benjamin was granted a permanent commission as a lieutenant. Instead, he was put on the unemployed list of the Royal Air Force on 19 August 1919. His commission as lieutenant was cancelled on 5 September 1919.

References

1883 births
Year of death unknown
Royal Flying Corps officers
Recipients of the Military Cross
British World War I flying aces
British emigrants to South Africa
Military personnel from London
South African World War I flying aces